The Hidan of Maukbeiangjow is a 1973 exploitation film written by Don Elkins and Carla Rueckert and directed and filmed by Lee Jones.  As a sci-fi/comedy/action film. It was re-released as Invasion of the Girl Snatchers in the mid-1980s under the 'Le Bad Cinema' line. and then again on VHS in 1999.

Synopsis
Kaspar (Ele Grigsby) is partnered with Detective Sam Trowel (Hugh Smith). he locates the hideout of a kidnapping and drug ring that Trowel has been unable to find because he is too focused on procedures.  Trowel hires safecracker Frederick Fenzer (David Roster) and his bodyguard, Noname (Harlo Cayse), as phoney suppliers to set up Ruthie (Carla Rueckert) to be kidnapped by the ring. She is supposed to wear a tracking device in her bra, but she's taken before she can put it on. Fortunately, Kaspar already knows where the hideout is.

At the compound, named the 'Hidan of Maukbeiangjow', Ruthie is killed and replaced with a confused alien. This is supervised by the sorcerer Aph (Charles Rubin), who is a slave to an evil alien named Utaya (McCain Jeeves). Aph accidentally led Utaya to Earth. Another human looking alien (Pepper Thurston), teaches the replacement Ruthie how to function in her new body. She also kidnaps Trowel so his body could to be used by Utaya.

Freddie's brother "Junior" (Paul Lenzi) shows up to deliver his brother's stash of marijuana and give Aph's apprentice, Prudence (Elizabeth Rush), a hard time. Prudence and Kaspar end up bound together by the alien Ruthie.

Utaya wants Fenzer's help in stealing a billion dollars. He also wants Kaspar's body ready as a back-up vessel, since the dead are usually vapid and confused or become zombies. Junior attempts to catch and rape Prudence, but she shoots him after a lengthy chase. Freddie complains that Utaya is simply Trowel high on junk, and puffing his joint complains, "I don't work with nobody (puff) who ain't straight!" Trowel/Utaya is killed in battle, as are most of the kidnapping ring. Meanwhile, romance has blossomed between Prudence and Kaspar, so Aph gives the couple a ride in his convertible.

Partial cast

Elizabeth Rush as Prudence
Ele Grigsby as Kaspar
David Roster as Frederick 'Freddie Fingers' Fenzer, Jr.
Paul Lenzi as Frederick 'Junior' Fenzer, Jr.
Charles Rubin as Aph
Hugh Smith as Sam Trowel / Utaya II
McCain Jeeves as Utaya I
Harlo Cayse as Noname
Carla Rueckert as Ruthie (as Ellen Tripp)
Ruth Horn as Bunny / Rosebush
James Rueckert as Zombie
Lee Boylan as ...  Higgie

See also
 List of American films of 1973

References

External links 
 
 
 
Invasion of the Girl Snatchers at Rotten Tomatoes
 The William Girdler Conservation Society

1973 films
American comedy horror films
1970s fantasy comedy films
1970s science fiction comedy films
1970s science fiction horror films
American fantasy comedy films
1970s comedy horror films
1973 comedy films
1970s English-language films
1970s American films